Legionella waltersii is a Gram-negative catalase- and oxidase-positive bacterium from the genus Legionella with a single polar flagellum which was isolated from a drinking water distribution system in Adelaide in Australia. L. waltersii is named after Reginald P. Walters. Legionella waltersii may can cause pneumonia.

References

External links
Type strain of Legionella waltersii at BacDive -  the Bacterial Diversity Metadatabase

Legionellales
Bacteria described in 1996